CineAsset is a complete mastering software suite by Doremi Labs that can create and playback encrypted (Pro version) and unencrypted DCI compliant packages from virtually any source. CineAsset includes a separate "Editor" application for generating Digital Cinema Packages (DCPs). CineAsset Pro adds the ability to generate encrypted DCPs and Key Delivery Messages (KDMs) for any encrypted content in the database.

Features

CineAsset DCP Editor

 Convert popular video files to DCI compliant digital cinema packages (DCPs)
 Multi-reel support
 Multiple Filters (Scale, XYZ Colorspace Conversion, Timecode Burn-in, Logo Overlay, Audio Delay, Trimmer)
 Create and playback DCPs with subtitles
 Generate encrypted DCPs (Pro version only)
 Support for still picture import (create DCPs from a single image)
 Custom Luts and Matrix values for color conversion (.csv and .3dl files)
 High Frame Rate support (47.95, 48, 50, 59.94, 60, 72 and 96)
 Supplemental DCP support
 Load/save project capability
 Command line support
 API Available
 Support for Projector Certificates
 KDM and Certificate Manager – database of KDMs and certificates creates an easy way to see properties make modifications to selected items
 CineInspect DCP validation tool
 Event Cinema support with H.264 encoding, MPEG2 encoding and VC1 wrapping
 DCP import with DKDM support
 Archive framerate support (16, 18.18, 20 and 21.82fps)

CineAsset Render Nodes (optional)

 Increases processing speed by distributing JPEG2000 encoding across multiple computers on a network
 Supports up to 5 render nodes per CineAsset

CineAsset Database

 Build clip databases
 Generate KDM's for encrypted content (Pro version only)
 Dropin folder for automated transfer of image sequences and other media files
 Multimedia Export (Image Sequence, WAV, QuickTime, MPEG)

CinePlayer DCP Player

 Real time XYZ to RGB color correction
 Playback encrypted DCPs
 Playback DCPs with subtitles
 Playback other multimedia formats (MXF, MOV, etc.)
 VU meter
 Adjustable playback framerate
 CineInspect DCP validation tool
 SDI output with third party I/O card

CineAsset Device Control
 Device KDM manager allows management of KDMs on selected device
 Convert, transfer, schedule and playback 2D or 3D video clips
 Ingest content via Ethernet or FTP and automate file transfer to servers
 Transport controls for the connected servers
 Retrieve Media Block certificates

CineAsset Task View

 Monitor and control tasks in the queue
 View detailed information about processes and incomplete tasks

CineExport DCP Export Plug-in for Compressor

 Compatible with Apple Compressor 3.5.3 and 4.0
 Standard version without encryption and Pro version with encryption and KDM generation

Supported formats

Input

Containers

 AVI
 MOV
 MXF
 MPG
 TS
 WMV
 M2TS
 MTS
 MP4
 MKV

Video Codecs

 JPEG2000
 ProRes 422
 DNxHD®
 YUV Uncompressed 8-10 bits
 DIVX®
 XVID®
 MPEG4
 AVC / H-264
 VC-1
 MPEG2

Supported Image Sequences

 BMP
 TIFF
 TGA
 DPX
 JPG
 J2C

Supported Audio Files

 WAV
 MP3
 WMA
 MP2

Output

JPEG2000

 2D and 3D at up to 4K resolution
 Bit Rate: 50–250 Mbit/s (500Mbit/s for frame rates above 30 fps)
 Speed: Faster than real-time processing when using optional render nodes

MPEG2

 I-Only or Long GOP
 1080p up to 80 Mbit/s

H264

 1080p up to 50 Mbit/s

VC1
 DCP wrapping only (no transcode)

See also 
 CineExport
 CinePlayer
 Non-linear video editing
 List of video editing software
 Comparison of video editing software

References

External links 
 CineAsset: Product page
 CineAsset: User Manual
 Download CineAsset (evaluation version)
 Instructional Videos on Youtube
 Doremi Labs website

Video editing software
Film and video technology
Dolby Laboratories